Arripiado is a village in the Parish of Carregueira the northern county of Chamusca near the southern bank of the River Tagus. It is in this beautiful town that begins the famous Wetland Ribatejana. Being built on a slope, the constructions of these stops, ranging from the 118 National Highway, to the waterfront.

References

Villages in Portugal
Populated places in Santarém District